Kam Kordan (also Romanized as Kam Kordān) is a village in Mosaferabad Rural District, Rudkhaneh District, Rudan County, Hormozgan Province, Iran. At the 2006 census, its population was 75, in 19 families.

References 

Populated places in Rudan County